Kotagiri Vidhyadher Rao (April 28 1946 – 20 July 2013) was an Indian politician and a MLA and Minister. He was a five time MLA from Eluru district, Andhra Pradesh. He was in TDP, PRP (which joined Congress).

Early life
He was born in Thurpu Edavalli village in Eluru, West Godavari, Andhra Pradesh.

Career
Kotagiri Vidyadhara Rao began his political career as a village sarpanch. He served as MLA from the Chintalapudi assembly constituency for five terms and served as a Minister of the State in both N T Rama Rao and Chandrababu Naidu cabinets. He joined Praja Rajyam in 2009 and was political affairs committee member. He was a key aide to actor-turned-politician Chiranjeevi.

He served in the following positions:

1978: Chairman - Agricultural Market Committee, Chintalapudi

1981: Vice President - Panchayat Samithi, Chintalapudi

1983: MLA, Chintalapudi - elected as an Independent, later joined Telugu Desam Party in Oct. 1983

1985 - 1999: Re-elected as MLA, Chintalapudi

1984: Chairman - AP Industries Infrastructure Corp.

1985: Director - AP Industries Development Corp.,  Director- AP Kadhi & Village Industries Board

1987: Director - AP State Road Transport Corp., Chairman Shatavahana Region, APSRTC

1987 - 1989: Chairman Public Undertakings Committee, AP Legislature

1989: Deputy Leader of Opposition

1991 - 1994: Leading the Opposition after Shri NT Rama Rao announced that he would not attend Assembly for the ill treatment, extended by the Govt. on the Floor of the House

1994: Appointed Minister for Agriculture (N. T. Rama Rao cabinet)

1995 - 1996: Appointed Minister for Panchayat Raj Rural Development & Rural Water Supply (N. T. Rama Rao cabinet)

1996 - 1999: Minister for Agriculture (N. Chandrababu Naidu cabinet)

1999 - 2004: Minister for Large scale Industries (N. Chandrababu Naidu cabinet)

Death
He died in his home in Eluru, Andhra Pradesh from a cardiac arrest on 20 July 2013.

Personal life
Vidhyadher Rao was married, had a son (Sridhar Kotagiri) and a daughter (Anitha Ponnala) and four grandchildren.

References

1946 births
2013 deaths
Telugu politicians
Indian National Congress politicians from Andhra Pradesh
People from Eluru
People from West Godavari district
Praja Rajyam Party politicians
Andhra Pradesh MLAs 1983–1985
Andhra Pradesh MLAs 1985–1989
Andhra Pradesh MLAs 1989–1994
Andhra Pradesh MLAs 1994–1999
Andhra Pradesh MLAs 1999–2004